Arthur Dunkelblum (23 April 1906 – 27 January 1979) was a Polish-born Belgian chess master.

Arthur Dunkelblum was born in Cracow (Kraków-Podgórze), Austria-Hungary. He played for Belgium in eleven Chess Olympiads: 1928, 1933, 1937, 1950, 1954, 1956, 1958, 1960, 1962, 1966, and 1968 (one of the biggest gap between first and last appearance at the Olympiads).

In 1922, he took 3rd in Antwerp (BEL-ch, Edgar Colle won). In 1925, he took 3rd in Brussels (BEL-ch, qualif.). In 1926,he tied for 5-7th in Spa. In 1930, he tied for 2nd-3rd in Brussels (George Koltanowski won). In 1933, he took 3rd in Brussels (BEL-ch). In 1934, he took 3rd in Liège (BEL-ch, Victor Soultanbeieff won). In 1937, he took 9th in Ostend. In 1937, he took 3rd in Brussels (BEL-ch).

After World War II, he tied for 5-6th in Baarn C (Baruch Harold Wood won) in 1947. Dunkelblum won the Belgium Championship at Bruges 1949. He tied for 2nd-3rd, behind Robert Lemaire, in Ghent (BEL-ch) in 1950. His best tournament result was at Gijon, Spain, in 1950 where he finished 2nd-3rd, behind Nicolas Rossolimo. In 1957, he tied for 10-11th in Dublin (zt, Luděk Pachman won).

Dunkelblum was awarded the International Master title in 1957.

See also
 List of Jewish chess players

References

External links
 

1906 births
1979 deaths
Chess International Masters
Chess Olympiad competitors
Jewish chess players
Belgian chess players
Polish chess players
Jews from Galicia (Eastern Europe)
Belgian Jews
Belgian people of Polish-Jewish descent
Polish emigrants to Belgium
Sportspeople from Kraków
20th-century chess players